Lai da Palpuogna (Romansh; German: Palpuognasee) is a mountain lake at Albula Pass in the municipality of Bergün, in the Grisons, Switzerland. In a 2007 television program of the Swiss channel SF 1, the lake was voted the most beautiful place in Switzerland.

See also
List of mountain lakes of Switzerland

External links

Lakes of Graubünden
Reservoirs in Switzerland
LLaidaPalpuogna
Bergün Filisur